Klemme Community School District was a school district in the town of Klemme, Iowa. The school was built in 1939 using money from a bond issue and the Public Works Administration. It expanded in 1957, with  the addition of an elementary school.

The district merged into the Belmond–Klemme Community School District on July 1, 1994. The Klemme school building closed after the district consolidation.

References

External links
 Klemme School history at Klemme  Homestead  Museum
 Klemme at IowaSchools.com

Defunct school districts in Iowa
Education in Hancock County, Iowa
1939 establishments in Iowa
School districts established in 1939